Formula of Love is a 1984 Soviet romantic fantasy comedy film directed by Mark Zakharov, from a screenplay by Grigori Gorin. It is loosely based on the story "Count Cagliostro" by Aleksey Tolstoy about a magician who sets out to prove humans' power against the gods by fabricating love without the influence of the gods. It also follows the story lines of the woman he is trying to force to fall in love, the family with which they are staying and the stories of his servants.

Cast 
 Nodar Mgaloblishvili as Count Giuseppe Cagliostro (voiced by Armen Dzhigarkhanyan)
 Yelena Valyushkina as Maria Ivanovna
 Aleksandr Mikhailov as Aleksei Alekseyevich Fedyashev
Yelena Aminova as Lorenza
 Aleksandr Abdulov as Jacob
 Semyon Farada as Margadon (singing voice by Gennady Gladkov)
 Tatyana Pelttser as Fedosya Ivanovna
Aleksandra Zakharova as Fimka
 Leonid Bronevoy as Doctor
 Nikolay Skorobogatov as Stepan Stepanovich

References

External links 
 
 

1984 romantic comedy films
1984 films
1984 fantasy films
Soviet fantasy comedy films
Russian fantasy comedy films
Russian romantic comedy films
Soviet romantic comedy films
1980s Russian-language films
Films directed by Mark Zakharov
Films scored by Gennady Gladkov
Films based on short fiction
Mosfilm films
Films about Alessandro Cagliostro
Films set in the 1780s
Films set in country houses
Films set in the Russian Empire
Films set in Saint Petersburg
Films shot in Moscow Oblast
Films shot in Saint Petersburg